USS Dempsey has been the name of more than one United States Navy ship, and may refer to:

 , a tug and patrol vessel in commission from 1917 to 1919
 USS Dempsey (DE-267), a destroyer escort transferred to the United Kingdom upon completion which served in the Royal Navy as the frigate  from 1943 to 1946
 , a destroyer escort in commission from 1943 to 1945

United States Navy ship names